Aïn Témouchent is a city in north western Algeria, it is the capital of Aïn Témouchent Province.  Ain Temouchent is located 72 km south-west of Oran, a city with which it is closely associated, and 63 km west of Sidi Bel Abbes. Known as "la Florissante", it is set in a narrow fertile basaltic valley amid vineyards and orchards.

History 

The town was founded  in 1851 by Spanish immigrants, who built on what had been the site of Roman Albulae and Arab Ksar ibn Senar.

Population over time

Gallery

References 

Communes of Aïn Témouchent Province
Province seats of Algeria
Populated places established in 1851